Jeffery Scott Campbell (born April 12, 1973) is an American comic book artist.  He was initially known professionally as Jeffery Scott, but is best known as J. Scott Campbell. He rose to fame as an artist for Wildstorm Comics, though he has since done work for Marvel Comics (most notably as a cover artist on The Amazing Spider-Man), and the video game industry.

Early life
Jeffery Scott Campbell was born in East Tawas, Michigan, though he has no memories of that city, as his family moved when he was very young to Denver, Colorado, which he regards as his home. He has a younger sister, who is a digital architect who fills out the orders for Campbell's e-commerce website, and a younger brother who is a musician.

As a child, Campbell was interested in cartoons, rather than comics. He first became interested in comics when, as a teenager, he visited a friend's house, where his friend showed him Uncanny X-Men Annual #10, which featured artwork by Arthur Adams, whose style would greatly influence Campbell's own. Campbell, explains, "I immediately went nuts over the book. That book had such detail. The art was fantastic. It just started me going. It just turned me around. All of a sudden I wanted to do this, and I felt I could." Campbell began collecting, purchasing books based on the art, not the title, which he says made his collecting habits somewhat difficult at times.

In 1989, Campbell, then age fifteen, entered for and won an "Invent the Ultimate Video Game" contest featured in the issue 6 of Nintendo's official magazine, Nintendo Power, whereby submitted contest entries were to consist of drawings and concepts for a video game. Color drawings from "Lockarm," the videogame idea he pitched, were published in the magazine as the winning entry.

Career

Wildstorm/DC Comics

After graduating from high school in Aurora, Colorado, Campbell began doing freelance commercial art jobs. As Campbell prepared to show his samples at the 1993 San Diego Comic Con, the series WildC.A.T.S premiered by Jim Lee's publishing studio, Wildstorm Productions (then called Homage Studios). One issue advertised a talent search for which readers could submit artwork, so Campbell put together a package that included a four-page WildC.A.T.S story and sent it in. A week and a half later, Jim Lee telephoned Campbell and asked him if he would move to San Diego to work for him. Initially working under the professional name Jeffery Scott, Campbell's first comics work was two pinups for the Homage Studios Swimsuit Special in 1993. His subsequent work for Wildstorm includes spot illustrations in WildC.A.T.S Sourcebook. and Stormwatch #0.

Campbell went on to co-create the teen superhero team Gen¹³, which debuted in Deathmate Black (September 1993), before going on to star in their own five-issue miniseries in January 1994. The series was initially co-written by Brandon Choi and Jim Lee, but Campbell became a co-writer with issue #3. The team was eventually given their own regular ongoing series, which debuted in March 1995. Campbell was co-writer on the series until issue #18, and was the regular artist, leaving the book after issue #20 (June 1997).

In 1998, Campbell, together with fellow comics artists Joe Madureira and Humberto Ramos, founded the Cliffhanger imprint as part of Wildstorm Productions. He launched his comic series Danger Girl through this imprint. The story, which followed the adventures of a group of female secret agents, made the most of Campbell's talents drawing well-endowed women and dramatic action sequences.

The Danger Girl series has since generated a video game for the Sony PlayStation, as well as several comic spinoffs in the forms of limited series and one-shots that were drawn by different artists in the American comics industry. Most of these spin-offs featured story outlines from Campbell himself.

In August 2005, Campbell published Wildsiderz, which he co-created with his Danger Girl writing partner Andy Hartnell.

In February 2006, the 200th issue of Nintendo Power included a poster featuring prominent Nintendo characters drawn by Campbell in his unique art style, along with an interview whereby Campbell recalled his memories of the "Invent the Ultimate Video Game" Contest.

That same year, Campbell provided a variant incentive cover for Justice League of America (vol. 2) #0, the first issue of Brad Meltzer's run on the title.

In 2007, Campbell illustrated the covers to the Freddy vs. Jason vs. Ash six-issue limited series.

Marvel Comics
At the WizardWorld 2006 Comic Convention held in Los Angeles, Marvel Comics announced that Campbell signed an exclusive contract with the company, and to work on a Spider-Man series with writer Jeph Loeb. Between 2001 and 2013 Campbell did numerous covers for The Amazing Spider-Man, including issues 30 - 35 in 2001, 50 - 52 and 500 in 2003, and seven issues done sporadically from issues 601 in 2009 and 700 in 2013. His cover to issue #30 was used as the cover of the 2003 trade paperback that collected issues 30 and 31.

In October 2016, Marvel Comics and New York-based retailer Midtown Comics jointly decided to pull from circulation Campbell's variant cover  of the first issue of The Invincible Iron Man, produced exclusively for that store, after previews of the cover were criticized for sexualizing the depicted character, 15-year-old Riri Williams. The cover depicted the character, a teenaged MIT engineering student who reverse engineered one of Iron Man's armored suits to wear herself, in a midriff-baring crop top, in contrast to the more modest way in which artist Stefano Caselli depicted the character in the book's interior art. Campbell called the decision "unfortunate," explained that his rendition of the character was intended to depict "a sassy, coming-of-age young woman". He regarded the reaction to the cover as a "faux controversy", saying, "I gave her a sassy 'attitude'...'sexualizing' was not intended. This reaction is odd." Brian Michael Bendis, the writer on the series, was pleased with the decision to pull the cover, saying that while he liked the face Campbell had drawn on Riri when he viewed the art as a work in progress, he disliked the completed art, saying, "Specialty covers are not in my purview and it was being produced separately from the work of the people involved in making the comic. Not to pass the buck but that’s the fact. If I had seen a sketch or something I would have voiced similar concerns. I am certain the next version will be amazing."

Technique and materials

Campbell does his pencil with a lead holder, and Sanford Turquoise H lead, which he uses for its softness and darkness, and for its ability to provide  a "sketchy" feel, with a minimal amount of powdery lead smearing.  He uses this lead because it strikes a balance between too hard, and therefore not dark enough on the page, and too soft, and therefore prone to smearing and crumbling. Campbell avoids its closest competitor because he finds it too waxy. Campbell has also used HB lead and F lead. He maintains sharpness of the lead with a Berol Turquoise sharpener, changing them every four to six months, which he finds is the duration of their grinding ability. Campbell uses a combination of Magic Rub erasers, eraser sticks, and since he began to ink his work digitally, a Sakura electric eraser. He often sharpens the eraser to a cornered edge in order to render fine detailed work.

References

External links

 
 
 J. Scott Campbell on deviantART
 J. Scott Campbell Image Gallery at Comic Art Community
 Video of Campbell speaking at the 2009 New York Comic Con (Time Stamp: 4:53)

1973 births
American comics artists
Living people
People from Iosco County, Michigan